Edith Stephens Wetland Park is a nature reserve for wetlands and fynbos, located in the city of Cape Town, South Africa.

The park consists of a large seasonal wetland, with surrounding stretches of Cape Flats Sand Fynbos and Cape Flats Dune Strandveld vegetation. Seven Red Data plant species have been recorded here as well as nearly a hundred species of bird, several amphibians (including a population of endangered Western Leopard Toad), reptiles and mammals.
The  park was originally built around a smaller piece of land that was donated by the botanist Edith Stephens. She intended it to preserve the rare Isoetes capensis plant, which exists nowhere else on Earth. After subsequent additions to take it to its present size, the resulting park was named after her. 

The park is run by the City of Cape Town in partnership with the local community. It now has an Environmental Education Centre, boardwalk trails, a picnic area, a bird hide and a garden of medicinal plants.

See also
 Biodiversity of Cape Town
 List of nature reserves in Cape Town
 Cape Flats Sand Fynbos
 Cape Flats Dune Strandveld
 Cape Lowland Freshwater Wetland

References

Nature reserves in Cape Town
Protected areas of the Western Cape